Bah-Biau Punan is an Austronesian language spoken by the Punan Bah and Punan Biau people of Borneo in Indonesia, Malaysia and Brunei.

References

Punan languages
Languages of Indonesia
Languages of Malaysia
Endangered Austronesian languages